"The One" is the title track and first single released from English musician Elton John's 1992 album of the same name. On bonus footage for the DVD release of his concert Live in Barcelona, John states that he felt an intense connection to Bernie Taupin's lyrics for the song, in light of his personal circumstances around the time of making the album, in particular the line "for each man in his time is Cain until he walks along the beach".

Release and reception
"The One" reached No. 9 on the US Billboard Hot 100, No. 1 on the Billboard Adult Contemporary chart, and No. 10 on the UK Singles Chart. In Canada, it reached No. 1 on the RPM 100 chart for two weeks and the RPM Adult Contemporary chart for five weeks. In Europe, it topped the Portuguese chart and reached the top 10 in seven other countries. It was nominated for Best Male Pop Vocal Performance at the 1993 Grammy Awards.

Music video
The music video was directed by Russell Mulcahy. It features John on a reflector and a mirror while singing it and several flags (similar to the "Healing Hands" video).

Live performances
John performed the song at the 1992 VMAs and the rest of his tours in the 1990s. He put this song permanently in his solo concert tours later on, as the year 2000 was the last time the song was performed with the band.

Accolades
Grammy Awards

|-
|style="width:35px; text-align:center;" rowspan="2"|1993 || rowspan="2"| "The One" || Best Pop Vocal Performance – Male || 
|-

Track listings
CD maxi
 "The One" (edit) – 4:31
 "Suit of Wolves" – 5:38
 "Fat Boys and Ugly Girls" – 4:12

7-inch single
 "The One" (edit)
 "Suit of Wolves"

Personnel
 Lyrics by Bernie Taupin
 Music by Elton John
 Engineered by David Nicholas
 Artwork by Gianni Versace
 Photography by Patrick Demarchelier
 Produced by Chris Thomas

Charts

Weekly charts

Year-end charts

References

1992 songs
Elton John songs
MCA Records singles
Music videos directed by Russell Mulcahy
Number-one singles in Portugal
The Rocket Record Company singles
RPM Top Singles number-one singles
Song recordings produced by Chris Thomas (record producer)
Songs with lyrics by Bernie Taupin
Songs with music by Elton John